Suresh Lalchand Shastri (born 15 September 1955) is an Indian cricket umpire.  He has stood in two Test matches and 19 One Day Internationals.

See also
 List of Test cricket umpires
 List of One Day International cricket umpires
 List of Twenty20 International cricket umpires

External links 

1955 births
Living people
Indian Test cricket umpires
Indian One Day International cricket umpires
Indian Twenty20 International cricket umpires
Indian cricketers
Rajasthan cricketers
Central Zone cricketers
People from Jodhpur